Brian Jeffery Mast (born July 10, 1980) is an American politician and U.S. military veteran who has served as the U.S. representative for Florida's 21st congressional district since 2017. The district, numbered as the 18th district from 2017 to 2023, includes portions of the Palm Beaches and Treasure Coast. Mast is a member of the Republican Party.

A veteran of Operation Enduring Freedom, Mast lost both his legs while serving as a U.S. Army explosive ordnance disposal technician in Afghanistan in 2010.

Early life and education 

Mast was born and raised in Grand Rapids, Michigan. He is the son of James Mast and Tixomena Trujillo. His maternal grandparents were immigrants from Mexico. Mast graduated from South Christian High School in 1999. In 2016, he obtained a Bachelor of Liberal Arts from Harvard University Extension School with a concentration in economics and minors in government and environmental studies.

Military service 
After graduating from high school, Mast enlisted in the United States Army Reserve in May 2000 and became a combat engineer assigned to the 841st Combat Engineer Battalion. In 2006, he transitioned to the active U.S. Army and became an explosive ordnance disposal technician. Mast later joined the elite 28th Ordnance Company, a special operations explosive ordnance disposal unit that works alongside personnel of the 75th Ranger Regiment. He served in Afghanistan as part of Operation Enduring Freedom. On September 19, 2010, while clearing a path for United States Army Rangers in Kandahar, Mast stepped on an IED along the road. The explosion resulted in the amputation of both his legs and losing his left index finger.

Mast and his family were awarded a custom ADA-compliant home by the nonprofit organization Helping a Hero.

Civilian career 
After his honorable discharge from the Army, Mast was hired as an explosives specialist for the United States Department of Homeland Security. While recovering from his injuries at Walter Reed Army Medical Center, Mast provided explosive and counter-terrorism expertise to the Office of Emergency Operations at the National Nuclear Security Administration from July 2011 to February 2012, and as an instructor of homemade explosives for the Bureau of Alcohol, Tobacco, Firearms and Explosives.

U.S. House of Representatives

Elections

2016 

Mast first considered running for office while recovering from his injuries at Walter Reed Medical Center. It was reported in May 2015 that he was considering a run for Congress.

On June 8, 2015, Mast announced his candidacy for the Republican nomination for U.S. Representative in Florida's 18th congressional district. He defeated five opponents in the August 30, 2016, primary with 38% of the vote. Mast faced Democratic businessman Randy Perkins in the November 8 general election.

During the 2015-16 election campaign, Mast's largest donors were Duty Free Americas (owned by the pro-Israel Falic family), NextGen Management (a condo property firm), and Superior Foods (frozen foods).

Mast won the general election with 53% of the vote.

In 2016, Mast was briefly linked with World Patent Marketing, a company the Federal Trade Commission shut down as an invention promotion scam. World Patent Marketing donated money to Mast's campaign fund and said in a press release that he sat on their advisory board. Mast claimed no knowledge of being given a position on the board and said he only had a couple encounters with members of the company.

In 2018, Anthony Bustamante, a campaign consultant who had worked on Mast's 2016 campaign, told The Wall Street Journal that he had used data hacked from the Democratic National Committee by Guccifer 2.0, a front for Russia's GRU military intelligence service, to adjust Mast's campaign strategy. Guccifer 2.0 had leaked the hacked data to the HelloFLA blog.

2018 

On April 25, 2018, physician Mark Freeman announced a primary challenge to Mast, focusing on his promise to "defend the Second Amendment" and be an "unwavering partner" to President Donald Trump. Freeman called Mast an "establishment candidate" and complained about Mast's shift on gun control issues after the Parkland school shooting.

Mast defeated Freeman in the Republican primary. In the general election, he defeated Democratic nominee Lauren Baer, an attorney and foreign policy expert who served as an official in the Obama Administration, with 54% of the vote.

During the 2017-18 election campaign, Mast's largest donors were Duty Free Americas and Amway/Alticor (run by the DeVos family). Between March and June 2018, Mast's campaign received thousands of dollars from Soviet-born Igor Fruman, one of two business associates of Rudy Giuliani who later faced charges of violating federal campaign finance laws. After this allegedly illegal contribution was discovered and reported by the press, Mast's spokesman said he would disburse the funds to the Treasury Department, but less than two weeks later, Mast said, "I think we donated it to charity."

2020 

Mast ran for reelection in 2020 against Democratic nominee Pam Keith. In August 2020 he apologized for what he called "disgusting and inappropriate jokes" that he made on Facebook in 2009 and 2011 responding to a friend and subsequent campaign manager about sex with 15-year-old girls in South Africa and an end-of-the-world pick-up line involving rape or murder.

Tenure 

Mast was sworn in on January 3, 2017. He is a member of the Republican Main Street Partnership and the Climate Solutions Caucus.

After voting in favor of the Tax Cuts and Jobs Act of 2017, he had a 40% approval rating among his constituents; 45% said they were disappointed with his work in Congress.

In May 2018, the Associated Press reported that the Trump administration was considering Mast for secretary of the Department of Veterans Affairs.

Committee assignments 
 Committee on Foreign Affairs
 Subcommittee on the Middle East, North Africa and Global Counterterrorism
 Subcommittee on Europe, Energy, the Environment and Cyber
 Committee on Transportation and Infrastructure
 Subcommittee on Aviation
 Subcommittee on Water Resources and Environment

Caucus memberships 
 Republican Main Street Partnership
 Congressional Cannabis Caucus

Political positions 
In the first session of the 115th United States Congress, Mast was ranked the 32nd most bipartisan member of the House by the Bipartisan Index, a metric published by The Lugar Center and Georgetown's McCourt School of Public Policy to assess congressional bipartisanship.

During Trump's presidency, Mast voted in line with the president's stated position 90.6% of the time. As of September 2021, Mast had voted in line with Joe Biden's stated position 19.4% of the time.

Abortion 
Mast believes abortion should be illegal except in cases where the woman's life is at risk or in cases of rape or incest.

Agricultural subsidies 
In April 2018, Mast said he would probably vote for legislation to reduce support for sugar farmers, who under the then current Farm Bill were protected by fixed minimum prices, by limits on imports and on domestic production, and by government loans to sugar growers. "I expect I'll be supporting it when it comes up for a vote next week," Mast said of the Sugar Policy Modernization Act, "because it's important to the community I represent, and our waterways". The proposed act, reported TCPalm, "would make sugar import quotas more flexible and protect taxpayers from government-funded buyouts of surplus sugar". Mast said he would "probably be the only representative in the history of this district to vote against the sugar industry". Mast accepted over $15,000 in campaign donations from the executives at Florida Crystals and the Fanjul family that owns the company.

Cannabis 
In December 2020, Mast was one of only five House Republicans to vote for the Marijuana Opportunity Reinvestment and Expungement (MORE) Act. The act aimed to "correct the historical injustices of failed drug policies that have disproportionately impacted communities of color"; it included provisions to remove cannabis from the Controlled Substances Act, impose a federal tax on cannabis products, and use the proceeds of the tax to fund restorative justice programs. A month before the vote, Mast invested between $15,000 and $50,000 in the cannabis company Tilray. He disclosed the purchase on December 1.

In November 2021, Mast was one of four original cosponsors of the Republican-led States Reform Act to legalize cannabis federally and regulate it similarly to alcohol. In April 2022, after Representative Don Young died in office, Mast was named to replace him as a co-chair of the Congressional Cannabis Caucus.

Donald Trump 
In June 2016, Mast said he supported President Donald Trump "unanimously and wholeheartedly" in the 2016 presidential election. After the 2005 Access Hollywood recording of Trump making crude remarks about sexually assaulting women became public, Mast called Trump's remarks "inexcusable and disgusting". In February 2017, he voted against a resolution that would have directed the House to request ten years of Trump's tax returns, which would then have been reviewed by the House Ways and Means Committee in a closed session.

On December 18, 2019, Mast voted against both articles of impeachment against Trump. Of the 195 Republicans who voted, all voted against both impeachment articles.

On January 6, 2021, following the attack on the U.S. Capitol, Mast and 146 other Republican members of Congress voted against certifying the election of President Joe Biden.

LGBTQ+ rights 
Mast believes it was a mistake for the U.S. Supreme Court to rule on the constitutionality of same-sex marriage in Obergefell v. Hodges. Later, on July 19, 2022, he was among 47 Republican Representatives who voted for the Respect for Marriage Act, which would codify the right to same-sex marriage in federal law. However, Mast voted against final passage on December 8, 2022.

Gun policy 
Mast wrote an opinion piece in The New York Times in support of the Second Amendment right to bear arms, but said "it does not guarantee that every civilian can bear any and all arms." He supports a ban on assault weapons, citing his military background: "I cannot support the primary weapon I used to defend our people being used to kill the children I swore to defend."

After the Stoneman Douglas High School shooting, Mast announced his support for prohibiting the sale of assault and tactical firearms without confiscating such weapons that are already owned; ensuring that all firearm purchasers undergo a background check; improving background checks; banning the sale of gun accessories that enhance the firing rate of weapons, such as bump stocks; preventing those who have been detained for mental illnesses from purchasing firearms; ensuring that those on the Terror Watch List cannot purchase firearms; and placing anyone who makes threats of violence against schools on an FBI watch list for "a long time".

Mast also supports conducting further research on gun violence, which federal law currently prohibits in some ways.

Mast has at least partly blamed violent video games and violent movies for school shootings. In March 2017, he voted for the Veterans Second Amendment Protection Act. The measure passed the House but stalled in the Senate.

During 2015–16, Mast accepted $4,950 in campaign donations from the NRA's Political Victory Fund.

Healthcare 
Mast is in favor of repealing the Affordable Care Act (Obamacare). On May 4, 2017, he voted to repeal the Affordable Care Act and pass the American Health Care Act.

Immigration 
In June 2018, commenting on the Trump administration family separation policy, Mast said: "It is our duty as an American government to deal compassionately with any child from any nation, just as it is the responsibility of foreign families seeking asylum in the U.S. to choose only legal means to enter our nation so they can avoid family disruption. I am confident this process will be improved." Citing his own Mexican grandparents, he said, "The way that they got to work, the way that they assimilated to the American way of life and became a part of our system is not what we're seeing across the board."

In June 2018, a volunteer for the Democratic Party of Martin County who was angry about the Trump administration's immigration policy was arrested after threatening to kill Mast's children. The first trial in the case ended in a mistrial in April 2019.

International diplomacy 
Mast said he would support a Republican proposal to cut U.S. funding to the United Nations.

Mast was critical of Obama's Middle East policy. "ISIS is as strong as it is because of a lack of US leadership," he said in 2016. "ISIS could have been defeated at the time of the Arab Spring if we had sent in special operations forces. What's being done now is too little too late. It's going to require an all-out military effort. The only way to guarantee peace is to make the enemy surrender."

Iran nuclear deal 
Mast views Obama's Iran nuclear deal as a betrayal by the U.S. of its own national security as well as that of Israel, Jordan, and other regional allies. "The deal has aligned us with a Shia regime, which is just enabling extremism. This is going to make it very hard to get Sunni regimes to align with us, and Putin is now the go-to player in Syria with his alliance with Assad," he said in 2016.

Israel 
Mast is "a vocal supporter of Israel and Israelis", reported The Times of Israel during his 2016 campaign. "If anyone was lobbing rockets into the US, guys like me would be sent to kill them, and Americans would applaud us," he said.

Military and veterans affairs 
Mast, who sits on the House Veterans Affairs Committee, was the first member of Congress to open an office inside a federal agency. The office in question, which opened in 2018, was in the West Palm Beach Veterans Affairs facility. In 2018 he introduced a House bill that would make it easier for other House members to do the same. But in 2019, the Department of Veterans Affairs evicted Mast from the West Palm Beach office. Mast sent the VA Secretary Robert Wilkie a letter of complaint about the eviction.

Taxes and budget 
In October 2017, Mast voted against the original version of the Tax Cuts and Jobs Act of 2017 due to "out of control" federal spending, fear of the national debt growing, and a desire to see lower tax rates with loopholes closed. In December 2017, he voted for the final version of the bill, saying it "provides a lot of confidence to a lot of people" and is "a great moment for our country and our community".

Honors 
During his 12 years of U.S. Army service, Mast received the Bronze Star Medal, Purple Heart, Defense Meritorious Service Medal and Army Commendation Medal with "V" for valor device.

President Barack Obama invited Mast as a guest to his 2011 State of the Union Address, at which he was seated with First Lady Michelle Obama and Second Lady Jill Biden. Mast was named one of 10 House freshmen to watch by the Washington, D.C. newspaper The Hill, out of 55 new members of the House elected in 2016.

Personal life 
Mast lives in Palm City, Florida, with his wife Brianna and their four children, Madalyn, Maverick, Magnum, and Major. As of 2016, he attended the evangelical Calvary Chapel.

In January 2015, Mast volunteered with the Israel Defense Forces, working at a base outside Tel Aviv, packing medical kits and moving supplies.

See also 
 List of Hispanic and Latino Americans in the United States Congress

References

External links 

 Congressman Brian Mast official U.S. House website
 Campaign website
 
 
 
 Veterans Second Amendment Protection Act

|-

1980 births
21st-century American politicians
American amputees
United States Army personnel of the War in Afghanistan (2001–2021)
American politicians of Mexican descent
American politicians with disabilities
Bomb disposal personnel
Harvard Extension School alumni
Hispanic and Latino American members of the United States Congress
Living people
American evangelicals
Military personnel from Florida
Military personnel from Michigan
Politicians from Grand Rapids, Michigan
People from St. Lucie County, Florida
Republican Party members of the United States House of Representatives from Florida
United States Army soldiers
United States Department of Homeland Security officials
American gun rights activists